Cryptogemma timorensis is a species of sea snail, a marine gastropod mollusk in the family Turridae, the turrids.

Distribution
This marine species occurs off Timor Island.

References

 Tesch, P. (1915) Jungtertiäre und Quartäre Mollusken von Timor. Paläontologie von Timor, 5, 1–134, pls. 73–95.
 Powell, A.W.B. (1964) The family Turridae in the Indo-Pacific. Part 1. The subfamily Turrinae. Indo-Pacific Mollusca, 1(5), 227–346.

External links
 
 Martin K. (1933). Eine neue tertiäre Molluskenfauna aus dem Indischen Archipel. Leidsche Geologische Mededeelingen. 6(1): 7-32, 5 pls.
 Zaharias P., Kantor Y.I., Fedosov A.E., Criscione F., Hallan A., Kano Y., Bardin J. & Puillandre N. (2020). Just the once will not hurt: DNA suggests species lumping over two oceans in deep-sea snails (Cryptogemma). Zoological Journal of the Linnean Society. DOI: 10.1093/zoolinnean/zlaa010/5802562
 Biolib.cz: Gemmula teschi

timorensis
Gastropods described in 1915